The Above Maiden virus (ABMV) is a serotype of Great Island virus in the genus Orbivirus.  It should not be confused with Maiden virus (MDNV) which is a different strain of Great Island virus.

References

Orbiviruses
Infraspecific virus taxa